Guido Van Calster (born 6 February 1956) is a retired Belgian racing cyclist. He won the points classification in the 1984 Vuelta a España.

Major results

1977 
 2nd Flèche Ardennaise
 4th Overall Tour de l'Avenir
 1st Stages 2, 7, 8 & 12
1978 
 1st Stage 5 La Méditerranéenne
 3rd Paris–Tours
 4th Road race, National Road Championships
 8th Omloop Het Volk
 9th Overall Ronde van Nederland
1979
 3rd Overall Three Days of De Panne
 7th Road race, National Road Championships
 9th Tour of Flanders
 10th Overall Tour of Belgium
 10th Rund um den Henninger Turm
 10th Ronde van Limburg
1980 
 1st Stage 2 Critérium du Dauphiné Libéré
 4th La Flèche Wallonne
 6th Overall Vuelta a España
 6th Overall Tour of Belgium
 7th Grand Prix de Wallonie
 8th Liège–Bastogne–Liège
 10th Overall Tour du Haut Var
 10th Omloop Het Volk
 10th Kampioenschap van Vlaanderen
1981 
 1st Stage 5a Tour of the Basque Country
 2nd Brabantse Pijl
 3rd La Flèche Wallonne
 4th Overall Tour of Belgium
 1st Stage 1b 
 4th Paris–Roubaix
 5th Road race, UCI Road World Championships
 5th Liège–Bastogne–Liège
 6th Milan–San Remo
 9th Grand Prix de Fourmies
1982 
 1st Druivenkoers Overijse
 3rd Overall Tour de Suisse
 1st Stages 4a & 5 
 4th Overall Deutschland Tour
 4th Road race, National Road Championships
 6th Overall Vuelta a Andalucía
1983 
 3rd Grand Prix Pino Cerami
 8th La Flèche Wallonne
 10th Liège–Bastogne–Liège
1984 
 Vuelta a España
 1st  Points classification
 1st Stages 2 & 13 
 4th Overall Vuelta a Andalucía
 1st Stage 2
 5th Druivenkoers Overijse
 7th Trofeo Matteotti
 9th Road race, National Road Championships
1985 
 2nd Trofeo Pantalica
 6th Liège–Bastogne–Liège
 7th Overall Giro di Puglia
 7th Grand Prix de Wallonie
 8th Road race, National Road Championships
 10th Rund um den Henninger Turm
1986 
 1st Stage 2 Vuelta a Castilla y León
 9th Road race, National Road Championships
1987
 1st Stage 5 Vuelta a Castilla y León
 1st Stage 4 Vuelta a Aragón

References

External links 

1956 births
Living people
Belgian male cyclists
Tour de Suisse stage winners
Cyclists from Flemish Brabant
People from Scherpenheuvel-Zichem